Cronyn is a surname. Notable people with the surname include:

Benjamin Cronyn (1802–1871), the first bishop of the Anglican Diocese of Huron
Hume Cronyn, OC (1911–2003), Canadian actor of stage and screen
Hume Cronyn (politician) (1864–1933), Canadian politician and lawyer

See also
William B. Cronyn House, also known as the House at 271 Ninth Street, is a historic home located in Brooklyn, New York, New York
Frederick Cronyn Betts (1896–1938), Canadian politician and solicitor
Cronin